Campodea silvestrii  is a species of dipluran in the genus Campodea.

References

Diplura
Animals described in 1918